Eric Clarke (born 16 February 1957) is a former Australian rules footballer who played with St Kilda in the Victorian Football League (VFL).

Clarke, an Indigenous Australian, grew up in Creswick. Aged just 16, Clarke played in North Ballarat's 1973 premiership team and was also a member of their 1978 and 1979 premiership sides. In the 1980 VFL season he made six league appearances for St Kilda, where he played as a half forward. After leaving St Kilda, Clarke played for Redan, then returned to North Ballarat.

References

1957 births
Australian rules footballers from Victoria (Australia)
Indigenous Australian players of Australian rules football
St Kilda Football Club players
Redan Football Club players
North Ballarat Football Club players
Living people
People from Creswick, Victoria